American singer Kacey Musgraves has released five studio albums, one soundtrack, four demo albums, four extended plays, and 21 singles, six promotional singles, and 15 music videos. The earliest of Musgraves's material was released in the early 2000s with the issuing of demo albums, beginning with children duo effort Texas Two Bits with fellow student Alina Tatum, which self-released Little Bit of Texas in 2000. This was followed by her first solo album Movin' On (2002). She signed to Mercury Nashville in 2012. In early 2013, Musgraves released her debut full-length album Same Trailer Different Park. Critically acclaimed, the album debuted at number one on the Billboard Top Country Albums chart and number two on the Billboard 200. Its preceding lead single "Merry Go 'Round" peaked within the top 20 of the Billboard Hot Country Songs chart. The album would also spawn the top 40 singles "Blowin' Smoke" and "Follow Your Arrow". Same Trailer Different Park has since been certified platinum by the RIAA.

Musgraves's second studio album Pageant Material was released in June 2015. The record topped the Billboard Country Albums chart and debuted at number three on the Billboard 200. It spawned the singles "Biscuits" and "Dime Store Cowgirl", both minor hits on the Billboard country singles chart. Her third studio release was a holiday album titled A Very Kacey Christmas (2016). Critically acclaimed for its retro influences, the album debuted at number 11 on the Billboard country albums chart. In March 2018, Musgraves released her fourth studio album via MCA Nashville entitled Golden Hour. The album became her third studio release to reach number one on the Billboard Top Country Albums chart, selling 49,000 copies within its first week. Its lead single "Butterflies" debuted on the country singles chart around the same time.

Albums

Studio albums

Soundtrack albums

Demo albums

Extended plays

Singles

As lead artist

As featured artist

Promotional singles

Other charted songs

Music videos

Other appearances

Notes

References

External links 
 Full length discography at Discogs

Country music discographies
Discographies of American artists
Discography